The G-3 was a free trade agreement between Colombia, Mexico, and Venezuela that came into effect on January 1, 1995, which created an extended market of 149 million consumers with a combined GDP (Gross domestic product) of US$486.5 billion. The agreement states a ten percent tariff reduction over ten years (starting in 1995) for the trade of goods and services among its members. The agreement is a third generation one, not limited to liberalizing trade, but includes issues such as investment, services, government purchases, regulations to fight unfair competition, and intellectual property rights.

Venezuelan President Hugo Chávez announced in May 2006 that his country would withdraw from the trade bloc, due to differences with its two partners. In April, Venezuela had also announced its plans to leave the Andean Community, after Colombia and Peru reached free trade agreements with the United States and Ecuador kept in negotiations for one. Venezuela then joined Mercosur, while Mexico and Colombia founded the Pacific Alliance along with Peru and Chile.

See also
 Pacific Alliance
 G3 (disambiguation)
 Trade bloc
 Andean Community of Nations
 North American Free Trade Agreement (NAFTA)
 Central America Free Trade Agreement (CAFTA)
 Mercosur
 Free Trade Area of the Americas
 UNASUR

References

Treaties entered into force in 1995
Free trade agreements
Free trade agreements of Mexico
Treaties of Venezuela
Free trade agreements of Colombia
Colombia–Mexico relations
Colombia–Venezuela relations
1995 in Mexico
1995 in Colombia
1995 in Venezuela
2006 in Venezuela
Mexico–Venezuela relations